Maribel and the Strange Family (Spanish: Maribel y la extraña familia) is a 1960 Spanish comedy film directed by José María Forqué and starring Silvia Pinal, Adolfo Marsillach and Julia Caba Alba. A widower wishes to marry an ex-prostitute, but her friends become convinced that he has murdered his first wife.

The film's sets were designed by Enrique Alarcón.

Cast

References

Bibliography 
 Bentley, Bernard. A Companion to Spanish Cinema. Boydell & Brewer, 2008.

External links 
 

1960 comedy films
Spanish comedy films
1960 films
1960s Spanish-language films
Films directed by José María Forqué
1960s Spanish films